Bar Yehuda is a Hebrew language surname literally meaning "Son of Yehuda". Notable people with this surname include:

Rav Shmuel bar Yehudah
Yisrael Bar-Yehuda (1895–1965), Zionist activist and Israeli politician

See also
Ben Yehuda

Hebrew-language surnames
Patronymic surnames